John Timothy "Tim" Bethune (born 22 January 1962) is a retired Canadian sprinter. At the 1982 Commonwealth Games, he placed 7th in the 400m and 4th as a member of Canada's 4 × 400 metres relay. He was a member of Canada's 4 × 400 metres relay at the 1984 Summer Olympics, which placed 8th. 

After he retired, Bethune admitted to using performance-enhancing drugs at the Dubin Inquiry in 1989. He was never found to have taken any performance-enhancing drugs while competing, and he was exonerated from any allegations that he competed while using any performance-enhancing drugs.

References

External links
 
 
 
 
 
 

1962 births
Living people
Canadian male sprinters
Canadian sportspeople in doping cases
Doping cases in athletics
Ben Johnson doping case
Athletes (track and field) at the 1984 Summer Olympics
Olympic track and field athletes of Canada
Athletes (track and field) at the 1982 Commonwealth Games
Commonwealth Games competitors for Canada
World Athletics Championships athletes for Canada
Sportspeople from London